Frasinu River may refer to:

 Frasinu, a tributary of the Bistrița in Gorj County
 Frasinu, a tributary of the Cracăul Alb in Neamț County
 Valea Frasinului, a tributary of the Dâmbovița in Argeș County
 Frasinu, a tributary of the Lotrioara in Sibiu County

See also 
 Frasinu (disambiguation)
 Frasin River (disambiguation)
 Frăsinet River (disambiguation)